Brookston is an unincorporated community in Lamar County, Texas, United States.

The Chisum Independent School District serves area students.

Notable residents 

 Bobby Hammack (1922–1990), jazz pianist & composer
 Lyndon Pete Patterson (1934-2017), politician who served in the Texas House from 1977–1999.

External links
 

Unincorporated communities in Texas
Unincorporated communities in Lamar County, Texas